Niphona plagifera is a species of beetle in the family Cerambycidae. It was described by Per Olof Christopher Aurivillius in 1925. It is known from Sumatra, Borneo, and the Philippines.

References

plagifera
Beetles described in 1925